Kesi or KESI may refer to: 
Kesi (tapestry), (or K'o-ssu), a very luxurious form of Chinese silk tapestry
Kesi (Ganadhara), a Jain sacred figure
Kesi (rapper), Danish rapper artist
KESI, a Texas-based radio station now known as KVLY (FM)
Korea Elevator Safety Institute
Kyethi, a town in Burma

People with the surname
Pat Kesi (born 1973), American football player